Novate Milanese is a comune (municipality) in the Metropolitan City of Milan in the Italian region Lombardy, located about  northwest of Milan.

Novate Milanese borders the following municipalities: Bollate, Baranzate, Cormano, Milan.

Novate received the honorary title of city with a presidential decree on January 16, 2004.

Transport 

Novate Milanese had a station on the Milano-Saronno railway and it is served by S1 and S3 lines of Milan Transportation System.
A bus line, operated by ATM, connect Novate Milanese and Affori.

Notable people
 Giovanni Testori
 Vincenzo Torriani

References

External links
 Official website

Cities and towns in Lombardy